Madina Woula (also spelled Madina Oula) is a town in southern Guinea near the border with Sierra Leone.

Transport 
It is a likely station on the proposed Transguinean Railways.

See also 
 Transport in Guinea
 Railway stations in Guinea

References 

Populated places in the Kindia Region